Lassi is a yoghurt-based drink of South Asia.

Lassi may also refer to:
Lassi, Kefalonia, town in Kefalonia, Greece
Lassi, Hiiu County, village in Emmaste Parish, Hiiu County, Estonia
Lassi, Saare County, village in Salme Parish, Saare County, Estonia
Lassi people, an ethnic group of Pakistan
Lassi dialect, spoken in Pakistan
Mehrullah Lassi, Pakistani boxer

See also
Laasi, a village in Estonia
Lasi (disambiguation)
Lassy (disambiguation)
Lassie (disambiguation)